The Cleveland County Courthouse in Rison, Arkansas, was built in 1911.

The courthouse was listed on the National Register of Historic Places in 1977.

See also
Cleveland County Clerk's Building
National Register of Historic Places listings in Cleveland County, Arkansas

References

Courthouses on the National Register of Historic Places in Arkansas
Government buildings completed in 1911
Clock towers in Arkansas
Buildings and structures in Cleveland County, Arkansas
County courthouses in Arkansas
1911 establishments in Arkansas
National Register of Historic Places in Cleveland County, Arkansas